Weiltingen is a municipality  in the district of Ansbach in Bavaria in Germany.

Population development
1991: 1285 
1995: 1317 
2000: 1406 
2005: 1371 
2010: 1385 
2015: 1343
2016: 1381
2018: 1418

References

Ansbach (district)